Ogrodnik is a surname. Notable people with the surname include:

 Bogusław Ogrodnik (born 1965), Polish mountaineer, swimmer, diver, and entrepreneur
 Dawid Ogrodnik (born 1986), Polish actor
  (born 1989), Polish sportsperson and athletics competitor